The following list is a list of massacres that have occurred in Puerto Rico:

References 

Puerto Rico
Massacres